Miran Pavlin (born 8 October 1971) is a Slovenian former professional footballer who played as midfielder. He featured for clubs such as Olimpija, SC Freiburg, Olympiakos Nicosia, APOEL, FC Porto and Olimpija Ljubljana.

Club career
In 2009, Pavlin joined FC Koper on a combined player-director of football contract. In his first season with Koper, he won the Slovenian PrvaLiga. His second season there started poorly – after a resounding 5–1 defeat away to Dinamo Zagreb in UEFA Champions League qualifiers, he announced his immediate retirement, only to return to the Koper team a week later for a single league match against Rudar Velenje. Soon, after another dispute with club leadership regarding player signings and departures, he left the club altogether.

International career
Pavlin made 63 appearances for the senior Slovenia national team between 1994 and 2004. He was a participant at the 2002 FIFA World Cup and UEFA Euro 2000. During the second leg of Slovenia's Euro 2000 play-off against Ukraine, it was Pavlin's goal which secured a 1–1 draw and an aggregate victory to send Slovenia to their first major tournament.

Personal life
Luka Pavlin, who is also a footballer, is his nephew.

Career statistics

International
Scores and results list Slovenia's goal tally first, score column indicates score after each Pavlin goal.

Honours
Porto
Taça de Portugal: 2000–01

Koper
Slovenian PrvaLiga: 2009–10

See also
Slovenian international players

References

1971 births
Living people
Sportspeople from Kranj
Slovenian footballers
Association football midfielders
Slovenia international footballers
Slovenia under-21 international footballers
UEFA Euro 2000 players
2002 FIFA World Cup players
Slovenian PrvaLiga players
Slovenian Second League players
Cypriot First Division players
Bundesliga players
2. Bundesliga players
Primeira Liga players
NK Olimpija Ljubljana (1945–2005) players
APOEL FC players
Dynamo Dresden players
SC Freiburg players
Karlsruher SC players
Olympiakos Nicosia players
FC Porto players
NK Olimpija Ljubljana (2005) players
FC Koper players
Slovenian expatriate footballers
Slovenian expatriate sportspeople in Austria
Expatriate footballers in Austria
Slovenian expatriate sportspeople in Portugal
Expatriate footballers in Portugal
Slovenian expatriate sportspeople in Cyprus
Expatriate footballers in Cyprus
Slovenian expatriate sportspeople in Germany
Expatriate footballers in Germany